The Palace and the Fortress is a 1924 Soviet silent biopic directed by Aleksandr Ivanovsky.
The film is about the tragic fate of revolutionary democrat Mikhail Beideman who was held prisoner at the Peter and Paul Fortress and spent over twenty years in the west Alexei-ravelin.

Cast
 Yevgeni Boronikhin
 Yuri Korvin-Krukovsky
 Marina Yuryeva 
 Kondrat Yakovlev 
 Sergei Shishko 
 Gennadiy Michurin as Dmitriy Karakozov  
 Pyotr Andriyevsky 
 Yakov Malyutin 
 N. Komarovskaya 
 Petr Kuznetsov

References

Bibliography 
 Christie, Ian & Taylor, Richard. The Film Factory: Russian and Soviet Cinema in Documents 1896-1939. Routledge, 2012.

External links 
 

1924 films
Soviet silent feature films
Soviet biographical films
Russian biographical films
Soviet historical films
Russian historical films
1920s Russian-language films
Films directed by Aleksandr Ivanovsky
Soviet black-and-white films
1920s historical films
1920s biographical films
Russian black-and-white films